The second Charles Powell Leslie (1769–1831), known also as Charles Powell Leslie II was the son of Charles Powell Leslie I and the Hon. Prudence Penelope Hill-Trevor, daughter of Arthur Hill-Trevor, 1st Viscount Dungannon, he was, therefore, first-cousin of the 1st Duke of Wellington, the 1st Marquess Wellesley, the 3rd Earl of Mornington, the 2nd Viscount Dungannon and the 1st Baron Cowley also, his brother was the Bishop,  John Leslie. Leslie was Irish member of the UK Parliament for Monaghan (1801–1826) and New Ross (1830–1831). He succeeded his father, Charles Powell Leslie I, in representing Monaghan.

He was married to Anne (née Ryder) from 1791 to her death in 1813, with whom he had three daughters. He married Christina (née Fosbury), with whom he had three sons and four daughters including Charles Powell, John, Christiana, and Prudentia-Penelope.

Ancestors

References

1769 births
1831 deaths
UK MPs 1801–1802
UK MPs 1802–1806
UK MPs 1807–1812
UK MPs 1812–1818
UK MPs 1818–1820
UK MPs 1820–1826
UK MPs 1830–1831
Members of the Parliament of the United Kingdom for County Monaghan constituencies (1801–1922)
Members of the Parliament of the United Kingdom for County Wexford constituencies (1801–1922)